Robert E. Lee (1807–1870) was a Confederate general during the American Civil War.

Robert E. Lee may also refer to:

People
 Robert E. Lee Jr. (1843–1914), youngest son of Robert E. Lee, soldier, planter, businessman, author, and a scholar
 Robert Emmett Lee (1868–1916), Democratic member of the U.S. House of Representatives from Pennsylvania
 Robert E. Lee (architect) (1870–1925), Mississippi architect
 Robert E. Lee (FCC) (1912–1993), Commissioner of the Federal Communications Commission
 Robert E. Lee (playwright) (1918–1994), Broadway playwright and lyricist
 Robert Lee (dentist) (1920–2010), American dentist who emigrated to Ghana
 Robert E. Lee, early 1970s WCFL disk jockey

Education
 Robert E. Lee Academy, Bishopville, South Carolina
 Robert E. Lee Elementary School (disambiguation)
 Robert E. Lee High School (disambiguation)

Ships
 , a Confederate States Navy blockade runner
 Robert E. Lee (steamboat), a Mississippi steamboat of 1866
 , an Eastern Steamship Lines ship sunk by German submarine U-166 in 1942
 , a United States Navy fleet ballistic missile submarine

Sculptures

 Robert E. Lee Monument (Richmond, Virginia), by Antonin Mercié, first installed on Monument Avenue in 1890
 Robert E. Lee (Valentine), by Edward Virginius Valentine, in the crypt of the United States Capitol, Washington, D.C. since 1909
 Robert E. Lee Monument (Marianna, Arkansas), unveiled in 1910
 Robert E. Lee Monument (Charlottesville, Virginia), unveiled in 1924 
 Statue of Robert E. Lee (Austin, Texas), by Pompeo Coppini, on the University of Texas campus from 1933 to 2017
 Robert E. Lee on Traveller, by Alexander Phimister Proctor, in Dallas, Texas, from 1936 to 2017

Other uses
 Robert E. Lee (tree), a giant sequoia in Kings Canyon National Park, California, US
 General Lee (car), a 1969 Dodge Charger in the television series The Dukes of Hazzard

See also
 Robert Lee (disambiguation)